Dan Schottel (born August 10, 1935) is a former member of the Arizona House of Representatives. He served in the House from January 1993 through January 2001, representing district 12. He could not run for re-election in 2000 due to the amendment to the Arizona Constitution which limited politicians to serving four consecutive terms.

References

Republican Party members of the Arizona House of Representatives
1935 births
Living people